Yan Matheus Santos Souza (born 4 September 1998), commonly known as Yan or Yan Matheus, is a Brazilian professional footballer who plays as a winger for  club Yokohama F. Marinos.

Career statistics

Club

Notes

References

External links

1998 births
Living people
Brazilian footballers
Brazilian expatriate footballers
Association football forwards
Campeonato Brasileiro Série B players
Campeonato Brasileiro Série A players
Primeira Liga players
Liga Portugal 2 players
Esporte Clube Vitória players
Sociedade Esportiva Palmeiras players
G.D. Estoril Praia players
Sport Club do Recife players
Moreirense F.C. players
Yokohama F. Marinos players
Brazilian expatriate sportspeople in Portugal
Expatriate footballers in Portugal
Brazilian expatriate sportspeople in Japan
J1 League players
Expatriate footballers in Japan
People from Alagoinhas
Sportspeople from Bahia